Charles Edward Haydon Parker VC (10 March 1870 – 9 August 1918) was an English recipient of the Victoria Cross (VC), the highest and most prestigious award for gallantry in the face of the enemy that can be awarded to British and Commonwealth forces.

Details

Parker was born in Woolwich to a William (a Crimean War veteran) and Louisa Parker. He was 30 years old, and a sergeant in 'Q' Battery, Royal Horse Artillery, British Army during the Second Boer War when the following deed took place for which he was awarded the VC:

On 31 March 1900 at Sanna's Post (aka Korn Spruit), South Africa, 'Q' and 'U' Batteries of the Royal Horse Artillery were ambushed with the loss of most of the baggage column and five guns of the leading battery. When the alarm was given, 'Q' Battery went into action 1150 yards from the spruit, until the order to retire was received, when Major Phipps-Hornby, commander of 'Q' Battery, ordered the guns and their limbers to be run back by hand to a safe place. This most exhausting operation was carried out by, among others, Sergeant Parker, Gunner Isaac Lodge and Driver Horace Glasock, and when at last all but one of the guns and one limber had been moved to safety, the battery was reformed. The citation reads:

Parker was elected by the non-commissioned officers as described above.
He returned to the United Kingdom in early 1901, and received the VC from King Edward during an investiture at Marlborough House 25 July 1901.

Lieutenant Francis Maxwell (VC, CSI, DSO & Bar) also earned the VC in this action.

Later life

After 21 years of service in the Royal Horse Artillery, he retired and settled in Coventry. On the outbreak of the Great War, he initially worked in a munitions factory, but soon decided to rejoin and was posted to France with the Royal Field Artillery as a Battery Sergeant Major. In 1918, the father of two was badly wounded and forced to return home. Sadly, he never recovered from his wounds, and died aged 48 on 9 August 1918. He was buried in London Road Cemetery, Coventry and now has a Commonwealth War Graves Commission headstone

The medal
His Victoria Cross is displayed at the Royal Artillery Museum, Woolwich, England.

References

Monuments to Courage (David Harvey, 1999)
The Register of the Victoria Cross (This England, 1997)
Victoria Crosses of the Anglo-Boer War (Ian Uys, 2000)

External links
 

 
 AngloBoerwar.com

1870 births
1918 deaths
Military personnel from London
Burials in England
British recipients of the Victoria Cross
Second Boer War recipients of the Victoria Cross
Royal Horse Artillery soldiers
People from Lewisham
British Army personnel of the Second Boer War
British Army personnel of World War I
British Army recipients of the Victoria Cross
British military personnel killed in World War I